The Reinette Simirenko is an antique apple variety. The fruit has tender, crisp, greenish white flesh with a subacid flavor. It was the most widely grown variety in the Soviet Union.

Cosmonauts took Reinette Simirenko into space, lending popularity to the story that this variety originated in the garden of Ukrainian Leo Simirenko.

References

Apple cultivars
Agriculture in the Soviet Union
Agriculture in Russia